The Văleni oil field is an oil field located in Păușești, Vâlcea County, Romania. It was discovered in 2007 and developed by Petrom. It began production in 2008 and produces oil.

References

Oil fields in Romania